Ahmad Husni bin Mohamad Hanadzlah (born 21 July 1952) is the former Second Minister of Finance of Malaysia. He was appointed on 10 April 2009 when Datuk Seri Najib Tun Razak became Prime Minister. He was also the Member of Parliament for Tambun for five terms from April 1995 to May 2018. He is a member of the United Malays National Organisation (UMNO), a major component party in the Malaysia's opposition Barisan Nasional (BN) coalition.

Husni was educated at the University of Malaya. He entered the government sector in 1984 as general manager of the Perak State Islamic Economic Corporation. Ahmad Husni was a Deputy Minister of International Trade and Industry and Deputy Finance Minister before becoming a minister.

Career 
 1978 - Manager at AsiaVest Merchant bankers Berhad
 1989 - General Manager of Perak Islamic Economic Development Corporation
 1997 - Chairman of National Higher Education Fund Corporation (PTPTN)
 2001 - Chairman of the Commercial Vehicle Licensing Board
 2002 - MATRADE chairman
 2003 - Public Accounts Committee (PAC)
 2009 - Director of Khazanah Nasional Berhad

Politics 
 1983 - Started joining the UMNO branch of Sungai Rokam
 1983 - Member of the UMNO Youth Division of the Tambun Youth Movement
 1985 - Tambun Umno Division Youth Vice Chairman
 1987 - Tambun Umno Division Youth Chief
 1993 - Tambun Umno Division Chief

Elections 
In the 1999 Malaysian general election, Election Commission (EC) declared Ahmad Husni has won the Tambun parliamentary seat with a majority of 7,084. In the 2004 Malaysian general election, Ahmad Husni defeated Dr Khairuddin Abd Malek from PAS with a majority of 17,360. In the 2008 Malaysian general election, Ahmad Husni once again defended the Tambun parliamentary seat with 27,942 votes. His PKR opponent was the former Dermawan assemblyman Mohamad Asri Othman, who received 22,556 votes. The turnout percentage is 75%. The total of rejected ballots are 927.

Controversy 
 On March 7, 2010, Jelutong MP, Jeff Ooi Chuan Aun asked Ahmad Husni to apologize for his racist speech at the Penang Malay Chamber of Commerce on March 5, 2010.
 On 3 November 2016, Dato 'Seri Husni with 2 former cabinet ministers, Tan Sri Muhyiddin Yassin and Datuk Seri Shafie Apdal were convicted of the Sedition Act 1948 for breaching and debating debt-laden companies, 1MDB.

Election results

Honours
  :
  Knight Commander of the Order of the Perak State Crown (DPMP) – Dato’ (2000)
  Knight Grand Commander of the Order of the Perak State Crown (SPMP) – Dato’ Seri (2009)

See also

 Tambun (federal constituency)

References 

 

Living people
1952 births
People from Perak
Malaysian people of Malay descent
Malaysian Muslims
Malaysian economists
United Malays National Organisation politicians
Members of the Dewan Rakyat
Government ministers of Malaysia
Finance ministers of Malaysia
University of Malaya alumni
21st-century Malaysian politicians